Nationality words link to articles with information on the nation's poetry or literature (for instance, Irish or France).

Events

Works published
 Anonymous, Loves Garland; or, Posies for Rings, Handkerchers, and Gloves, anthology
 George Chapman, translator, Batrachomyomachia, publication year uncertain; the original work had been wrongly ascribed to Homer in antiquity; the book contains hymns and epigrams also not written by Homer
 Thomas Heywood, Gynaikeion; or, Nine Bookes of Various History. Concerninge Women, partly in verse
 Francis Quarles:
 Job Militant: With meditations divine and morall
 Sions Elegies, Wept by Jeremie the Prophet (see also Sions Sonnets 1625)

Births
Death years link to the corresponding "[year] in poetry" article:
 August 22 – Jean Renaud de Segrais (died 1701), French poet and novelist
 October 26 – Dosoftei (died 1693), Moldavian Metropolitan, scholar, poet and translator
 December 25 – Johannes Scheffler, also known as "Angelus Silesius" (died 1677), German poetry mystic and poet
 date not known – Edward Howard (died 1700), playwright and poet, brother of Sir Robert Howard

Deaths
Birth years link to the corresponding "[year] in poetry" article:
 Yuan Zhongdao (born 1570), Chinese poet, essayist, travel diarist and official

See also

 Poetry
 16th century in poetry
 16th century in literature

Notes

17th-century poetry
Poetry